Charles Grethen (born 2 June 1992, in Tuntange) is a Luxembourgish middle-distance runner competing primarily in the 800 and 1500 metres. He represented his country at three consecutive European Championships.

International competitions

Personal bests
Outdoor
800 metres – 1:46.44 (Oordegem-Lede 2016)
1000 metres – 2:18.95 (Pliezhausen 2016)
1500 metres – 3:32.86 (Tokyo 2020) NR
One mile- 3:53.20 (Oslo 2022) NR

Indoor
800 metres – 1:48.26 (Metz 2016)
1500 metres – 3:45.05 (Düsseldorf 2016)

References

1992 births
Living people
Luxembourgian male middle-distance runners
People from Mersch (canton)
Athletes (track and field) at the 2016 Summer Olympics
Olympic athletes of Luxembourg
Competitors at the 2015 Summer Universiade
Competitors at the 2017 Summer Universiade
Georgia Bulldogs track and field athletes
Athletes (track and field) at the 2020 Summer Olympics